A Night of Adventure is a 1944 American crime mystery film directed by Gordon Douglas. It stars Tom Conway, Audrey Long, and Edward Brophy.

Plot
Successful attorney Mark Latham neglects his wife, Erica, so she leaves him. Mark tries to win her back, but finds that she is now dating Tony Clair, an artist.

Julie Arden, jealous and upset that boyfriend Tony is stepping out on her, intends to shoot him in his apartment. Mark, who is there to confront Tony, wrestles away the gun, which goes off and kills her. An eyewitness mistakes Mark in a dark hallway for Tony, who is arrested and charged with the crime. Erica pleads with Mark to defend Tony in court.

As the trial proceeds, witnesses begin to realize that it was Mark, the attorney, and not the defendant who was in the hallway that night. He even shows that a pair of Tony's gloves fit himself. The gloves fit, the jury acquits, and Erica, realizing how clever her husband is, returns to him.

Cast
 Tom Conway as Mark
 Audrey Long as Erica
 Louis Borel as Tony
 Edward Brophy as Steve
 Jean Brooks as Julie
 Emory Parnell as Judge

See also
 List of American films of 1944

References

External links
 
 
 
 

1944 films
American crime films
1944 crime films
1944 mystery films
American mystery films
American films based on plays
Films directed by Gordon Douglas
Films scored by Leigh Harline
American black-and-white films
1940s American films